Salomon Bochner (20 August 1899 – 2 May 1982) was an Austrian mathematician, known for work in mathematical analysis, probability theory and differential geometry.

Life
He was born into a Jewish family in Podgórze (near Kraków), then Austria-Hungary, now Poland. Fearful of a Russian invasion in Galicia at the beginning of World War I in 1914, his family moved to Germany, seeking greater security. Bochner was educated at a Berlin gymnasium (secondary school), and then at the University of Berlin. There, he was a student of Erhard Schmidt, writing a dissertation involving what would later be called the Bergman kernel. Shortly after this, he left the academy to help his family during the escalating inflation. After returning to mathematical research, he lectured at the University of Munich from 1924 to 1933. His academic career in Germany ended after the Nazis came to power in 1933, and he left for a position at Princeton University. He was a visiting scholar at the Institute for Advanced Study in 1945-48.  He was appointed as Henry Burchard Fine Professor in 1959, retiring in 1968. Although he was seventy years old when he retired from Princeton, Bochner was appointed as Edgar Odell Lovett Professor of Mathematics at Rice University and went on to hold this chair until his death in 1982. He became Head of Department at Rice in 1969 and held this position until 1976. He died in Houston, Texas. He was an Orthodox Jew.

Mathematical work
In 1925 he started work in the area of almost periodic functions, simplifying the approach of Harald Bohr by use of compactness and approximate identity arguments. In 1933 he defined the Bochner integral, as it is now called, for vector-valued functions. Bochner's theorem on Fourier transforms appeared in a 1932 book. His techniques came into their own as Pontryagin duality and then the representation theory of locally compact groups developed in the following years.

Subsequently, he worked on multiple Fourier series, posing the question of the Bochner–Riesz means. This led to results on how the Fourier transform on Euclidean space behaves under rotations.

In differential geometry, Bochner's formula on curvature from 1946 was published. Joint work with Kentaro Yano (1912–1993) led to the 1953 book Curvature and Betti Numbers. It had consequences, for the Kodaira vanishing theory, representation theory, and spin manifolds. Bochner also worked on several complex variables (the Bochner–Martinelli formula and the book Several Complex Variables from 1948 with W. T. Martin).

Selected publications
 
 
 
 
 
  2016 reprint
 
  2013 reprint
  2014 reprint

See also
Bochner almost periodic functions
Bochner–Kodaira–Nakano identity
Bochner Laplacian
Bochner measurable function

References

External links

National Academy of Sciences Biographical Memoir

1899 births
1982 deaths
20th-century German mathematicians
20th-century American mathematicians
Jewish scientists
Differential geometers
Complex analysts
Mathematical analysts
Measure theorists
PDE theorists
Princeton University faculty
Rice University faculty
Polish Orthodox Jews
American Orthodox Jews
Jews from Galicia (Eastern Europe)
Scientists from Berlin
Institute for Advanced Study visiting scholars
Jewish emigrants from Nazi Germany to the United States